R. Sampath Raj is an Indian National Congress political activist and the former  mayor of Bengaluru city. 

He assumed office on 28 September 2017 and is a corporator from D. J. Halli ward.

He contested the 2018 Karnataka Legislative Assembly elections from C. V. Raman Nagar assembly constituency and was defeated by S. Raghu of BJP.

References

External links 
 

Living people
Indian National Congress politicians from Karnataka
Mayors of Bangalore
1969 births
Politicians from Bangalore